AD-X2 was an additive purported to extend lead-acid automotive battery life, marketed by California bulldozer operator Jess M. Ritchie in the late 1940s and early 1950s. After it was declared a fraud by the  National Bureau of Standards (NBS), a media blitz alleging collusion between battery manufacturers and the government led Commerce Secretary Sinclair Weeks to request NBS director Allen V. Astin’s resignation. After subsequent Senate hearings, the NBS's position was vindicated and Astin was reinstated.

References

Fraud in the United States